Silvia Bussoli (born 22 November 1993 in Pavullo nel Frignano) is an Italian volleyball player. In 2022, she plays for Wash4Green Pinerolo. 

In 2016-2017, she played as an outside hitter for Volley Pesaro.

She played in the Volley Summer Tour, beach volleyball tour.

References

1993 births
Living people
Italian volleyball players